The eight-circuit model of consciousness is a holistic model originally described by Timothy Leary, later expanded on by Robert Anton Wilson and Antero Alli, that suggests "eight periods [circuits] and twenty-four stages of neurological evolution". This model has been described as a potential route towards reconciling different interpretations of what it means to be a human being. The eight circuits, or eight systems or "brains", as referred by other authors, operate within the human nervous system. Each corresponds to its own imprint and subjective experience of reality. Leary and Alli include three stages for each circuit that details developmental points for each level of consciousness. 

Bringing the Eastern spiritual traditions, which perceive all objects and phenomena as various interrelated aspects of a single supreme reality, transpersonal psychology and modern sciences together, contemporary philosophers are able to design and develop a new approach to a human that will bridge the gap between different interpretations of a human being.

Overview
The first four circuits concern themselves with life on Earth, and the survival of the human species. The last four circuits are post-terrestrial, and concern themselves with the evolution of the human species as represented by so-called altered states of consciousness, enlightenment, mystical experiences, psychedelic states of mind, and psychic abilities. The proposal suggests that these altered states of consciousness are recently realized, but not widely utilized. Leary described the first four as "larval circuits", necessary for surviving and functioning in a terrestrial human society, and proposed that the post terrestrial circuits will be useful for future humans who, through a predetermined script, continue to act on their urge to migrate to outer space and live extra-terrestrially. Leary, Wilson, and Alli have written about the idea in-depth, and have explored and attempted to define how each circuit operates, both in the lives of individual people and in societies and civilizations.

The term "circuit" is equated to a metaphor of the brain being computer hardware, and the wiring of the brain as circuitry. The comparison of the brain to computer hardware and wiring has been replaced with models describing the different functions of brain networks and how they interact with each other.

Leary used the eight circuits along with recapitulation theory to explain the evolution of the human species, the personal development of an individual, and the biological evolution of all life.

The Eight Circuits

Each circuit listed has each name from Leary's book "Exo-Psychology" after the preface, and Wilson's book "Quantum Psychology" pgs.196-201. Note: In other books from Leary, Wilson, and Alli, the eight circuits have different names due to different interpretations and findings of each author. Please reference bibliography section for other works on labeling of each circuit.

Terrestrial

First Circuit
Leary referred to this as the Vegetative-Invertebrate Circuit and Wilson referred to it as the Oral Bio-Survival Circuit.

This circuit is concerned with nourishment, physical safety, comfort and survival,  suckling, cuddling, etc. It begins with one spatial dimension, forward/back.

This circuit is imprinted early in infancy. The imprint will normally last for life unless it is re-imprinted by a powerful experience. Depending on the nature of the imprint, the organism will tend towards one of two basic attitudes:
A positive imprint sets up a basic attitude of trust. The organism generally considers the environment benign and accepts and approaches. This is equivalent to a default life position of "you're okay" in the 'life positions' model of Transactional analysis.
A negative imprint sets up a basic attitude of suspicion. The organism generally regards the environment as hostile and flees and avoids. This is equivalent to a default life position of "you're not okay" in the 'life positions' model of Transactional analysis.

This circuit is said to have appeared in the earliest evolution of the invertebrate brain and corresponds to the reptilian brain of triune brain theory. This circuit operates in essentially the same way across mammals, reptiles, fish, primates and humans.

Wilson equated this circuit with the oral stage in the Freudian theory of psychosexual development, and proposed that this circuit is activated in adults by strong opioids.

Second Circuit
Leary referred to this circuit as the Emotional-Locomotion Circuit and Wilson called it the Anal-Territorial Circuit.  This circuit is imprinted in the toddler stage. It is concerned with domination and submission, territoriality, etc.

The imprint on this circuit will trigger one of two states:
Dominant, aggressive behavior. This imprint creates an 'alpha' social attitude. Equivalent to the 'top dog' position in the model of Fritz Perls, to 'I'm OK' in the  'life positions' model of Transactional analysis, and to master morality in the model of Friedrich Nietzsche.
Submissive, cooperative behavior. Equivalent to the 'bottom dog' position in the model of Fritz Perls, to 'I'm not OK' in the life positions model and to Nietzschean "slave morality".

This circuit is activated by depressants such as alcohol, barbiturates, and benzodiazepines. This circuit appeared first in territorial vertebrate animals and is preserved across all mammals. It corresponds to the mammalian brain of triune brain theory. Wilson equated this circuit with the anal stage in the Freudian theory of psycho-sexual development.

The first and second circuits both imprint in a binary fashion: trust/suspicion and dominance/submission. Thus there are four possible ways of imprinting the first two circuits:

Trusting 1st circuit and dominant 2nd circuit. I'm OK; you're OK. Friendly strength in the Interpersonal Circumplex. Fire in the four elements model. Choleric in the four humors model.
Trusting 1st circuit and submissive 2nd circuit. I'm not OK; you're OK. Friendly weakness. Water in the four elements model. Phlegmatic humor.
Suspicious 1st circuit and dominant 2nd circuit. I'm OK; you're not OK. Unfriendly strength. Air in the four elements model. Sanguine humor.
Suspicious 1st circuit and submissive 2nd circuit. I'm not OK; you're not OK. Unfriendly weakness. Earth in the four elements model. Melancholic humor.

Third Circuit
Leary called this the Laryngeal-Manual Symbolic Circuit and Wilson the Semantic Time-Binding Circuit
This circuit is imprinted by human symbol systems. It is concerned with language, handling the environment, invention, calculation, prediction, building a mental "map" of the universe and physical dexterity.

This circuit is activated by stimulants such as amphetamines, cathinones, cocaine, and caffeine. This circuit supposedly appeared first when hominids started differentiating from the rest of the primates.

Wilson, being profoundly influenced by General Semantics, writes of this circuit as the "time-binding circuit". This means that this circuit's contents, including human know-how, technology, science and so on, are preserved memetically and passed on from generation to generation, constantly mutating and increasing in sophistication.

Fourth Circuit
Leary called this the Socio-Sexual Domestication Circuit and Wilson the Socio-Sexual Circuit. 
This fourth circuit is imprinted by the first orgasm-mating experiences and local tribal moral standards. It is concerned with sexual pleasure (instead of sexual reproduction), local definitions of "moral" and "immoral", reproduction, rearing of the young, etc. The fourth circuit concerns itself with cultural values and operating within social networks. This circuit is said to have first appeared with the development of tribes.

Post-Terrestrial

Fifth Circuit
This circuit, called the Neurosomatic Circuit, is concerned with neurological-somatic feedbacks, feeling high and blissful, somatic reprogramming, etc. It may be called the rapture circuit.

When this circuit is activated, a non-conceptual feeling of well-being arises. This has a beneficial effect on the health of the physical body.

The fifth circuit is consciousness of the body. There is a marked shift from linear visual space to an all-encompassing aesthetic sensory space. Perceptions are judged not so much for their meaning and utility, but for their aesthetic qualities. Experience of this circuit often accompanies an hedonistic turn-on, a rapturous amusement, a detachment from the previously compulsive mechanism of the first four circuits.

This circuit is activated by ecstatic experiences via physiological effects of cannabis, Hatha Yoga, tantra and Zen meditation. Robert Anton Wilson writes, "Tantra yoga is concerned with shifting consciousness entirely into this circuit" and that "Prolonged sexual play without orgasm always triggers some Circuit V consciousness".

Leary describes that this circuit first appeared in the upper classes, with the development of leisure-class civilizations around 2000 BC.

Sixth Circuit
Leary labelled this the Neuro-Electric Circuit and Wilson called this the Metaprogramming Circuit.  Timothy Leary listed this circuit as the sixth, and the neurogenetic circuit as the seventh. In his Prometheus Rising, Wilson reversed the order of these two circuits, and described neurogenetic circuit as the sixth circuit, and the metaprogramming circuit as the seventh. In  Quantum Psychology, published later, Wilson reverted the order back to Leary's original schema.

This circuit is concerned with reimprinting and reprogramming the earlier circuits and of perceiving the relative (versus absolute) nature of the "realities" perceived by them: the sixth circuit becomes aware of itself. Leary thought that this circuit enables telepathic communication. He believed that the circuit was activated by 50-150 μg LSD, moderate doses of peyote, psilocybin mushrooms and meditation/chanting especially when used within in a group or ritual setting. Leary estimated that this circuit came "online" in 500 BC.

Seventh Circuit
Leary referred to this as the Neurogenetic Circuit. Wilson called this the Morphogenetic Circuit.  (Wilson here made reference to Rupert Sheldrake's morphogenesis theory.) This circuit is the connection of the individual's mind to the whole sweep of evolution and life as a whole. It is the part of consciousness that echoes the experiences of the previous generations that have brought the individual's brain-mind to its present level.

It deals with ancestral, societal and scientific DNA-RNA-brain feedbacks. Those who achieve this mutation may speak of past lives, reincarnation, immortality etc. It corresponds to the collective unconscious in the models of Carl Jung where archetypes reside.

Activation of this circuit may be equated with consciousness of the Great God Pan in his aspect of Life as a whole, or with consciousness of the Gaia, in which the biosphere is considered as a single organism.

Proponents of the Eight Circuit model believe that it is activated by 200-500 μg LSD, higher doses of peyote or psilocybin mushrooms, and by meditation.

The circuit, according to the model, first appeared among the Hindus in the early first millennium and later reappeared amongst Sufi sects.

Eighth Circuit
Leary referred to this as the Neuro-Atomic Metaphysiology and Wilson as the Non-Local Quantum Circuit. 
The eighth circuit is concerned with quantum consciousness, non-local awareness (information from beyond ordinary space-time awareness which is limited by the speed of light),  illumination. Some of the ways this circuit can get activated are: near-death experiences, DMT, high doses of LSD and, according to Wilson, almost any dose of ketamine.

Leary's contribution
Leary stated that the theories presented in Info-Psychology "are scientific in that they are based on empirical findings from physics, physiology, pharmacology, genetics, astronomy, behavioral psychology, information science, and most importantly, neurology."

Leary called his book "science faction" or "psi-phy" and noted he had written it "in various prisons to which the author had been sentenced for dangerous ideology and violations of Newtonian and religious laws".

Although Leary propounded the basic premise of eight "brains" or brain circuits, he was inspired by sources such as the Hindu chakra system.

Leary claimed that among other things this model explained the social conflict in the 1960s, where the mainstream was said to be those with four circuits active and characterized by Leary as tribal moralists and clashed with the counter-culturists, who were then said to be those with the fifth circuit active and characterized as individualists and hedonists. 

Leary's first book on the subject, Neurologic, included only seven circuits when it was published in 1973. Exo-Psychology, published in 1977, expanded the number of circuits to eight and clarified the subject. In it, he puts forward the theory that the later four circuits are "post terrestrial;" intended to develop as we migrate off this planet and colonize others. Once we begin space migration, according to Leary, we will have more ready access to these higher circuits. Exo-Psychology was re-published as revised by Timothy Leary with additional material in 1989 under the title Info-Psychology (New Falcon Publishing).

Other authors on the eight circuits

Leary's ideas heavily influenced the work of Robert Anton Wilson. Wilson's 1983 workbook Prometheus Rising is an in-depth work documenting Leary's eight-circuit model of consciousness. Wilson's unproduced 1993 screenplay, Reality Is What You Can Get Away With, published as a book, uses and explains the model. Wilson, like Leary, wrote about the distinction between terrestrial and post-terrestrial life.

The 1987 Angel Tech by Antero Alli, is structured around the Eight-circuit model of consciousness, while his 2014 book The Eight-Circuit Brain expands on this material.  Alli defines the word angel as "a being of light" and tech from the word "techne" meaning "art". The title is defined as "the art of being light". It includes suggested activities such as meditations and construction of Tarot card collages associated with each circuit and imprint.

The model is fairly prominent in chaos magic. It has been discussed in Chaotopia! by Dave Lee, a leading member of the chaos magic order the Illuminates of Thanateros, an order to which Leary and Wilson were granted membership. 

Rolf Von Eckartsberg also appears to have been influenced by the model.

See also
Eight Consciousnesses
Erik Erikson's "Eight stages of man" (1950)
Maslow's Hierarchy of Needs
Metasystem transition
Perceptual control theory
Programming and Metaprogramming in the Human Biocomputer
Psychedelic experience
Reality tunnel

References

Bibliography

Alli, Antero. Angel Tech: A Modern Shaman's Guide to Reality Selection, The Original Falcon Press; (1985) (Reprint - 2008). .
Alli, Antero. The Eight-Circuit Brain: Navigational Strategies for the Energetic Body, Vertical Pool Publishing; (2009). .
Leary, Timothy. The Game of Life, (1979) (Second Edition, 1993), with contributions by Robert Anton Wilson. 
Leary, Timothy. The Politics of Ecstasy, (1970)  
Leary, Timothy. Neurologic, 1973, with Joanna Leary.
Leary, Timothy. Exo-Psychology, 1977.
Leary, Timothy. Info-Psychology, New Falcon Publications, (1987) (Seventh Print, 2011), .
Leary, Timothy. What Does WoMan Want?, (1976), 88 books.
"Leary's 8 Calibre Brain", Psychic magazine, (April, 1976).
Lee, Dave. Chaotopia!, Mandrake of Oxford. .
Valle, R. & von Eckarsberg, R. The metaphors of consciousness. New York: Plenum Press.
Wilson, Robert Anton. Prometheus Rising, (1983), New Falcon Publications (Reprint - 1992). .
Wilson, Robert Anton. Quantum Psychology, (1990). .
Wilson, Robert Anton. Reality Is What You Can Get Away With, (1992) (new introduction added, 1996).

External links
Leary's Eight Circuit Model of Consciousness
The 8-Circuit Model of Timothy Leary and Robert Anton Wilson
The Eight Winner and Loser Scripts
Totem Pill - Animated Interpretation of the 8 Circuit Model by Marc Ngui

Consciousness studies
Psychological models
Theory of mind
Timothy Leary
Robert Anton Wilson

de:Timothy Leary#Neuronaler Schaltkreis nach Leary